The 1st Indian Infantry Brigade was an infantry brigade formation of the Indian Army during World War II. It was formed in September 1939, in Abbottabad in India. It was assigned to HQ Rawalpindi District until May 1942, when it joined the 23rd Indian Infantry Division until the end of the war.

Formation
1st Battalion, 5th Gurkha Rifles to November 1940
2nd Battalion, 6th Gurkha Rifles to April 1940
2nd Battalion, 5th Gurkha Rifles February to December 1940 and January to June 1941 
1st Battalion, 6th Gurkha Rifles April 1940 to February 1942
1st Battalion, Devonshire Regiment September 1940 to April 1941
1st Battalion, 7th Rajput Regiment October 1940 to September 1941
3rd Battalion, 5th Gurkha Rifles October 1940 to March 1941
3rd Battalion, 6th Gurkha Rifles October 1940 to March 1941
4th Battalion, 6th Gurkha Rifles March to October 1941
4th Battalion, 5th Gurkha Rifles March to October 1941
4th Battalion, 7th Gurkha Rifles March to October 1941
4th Battalion, 10th Gurkha Rifles March to October 1941
2nd Battalion, Nepalese Infantry (Rifle Regiment) April 1941 to February 1942
1st Battalion, Patiala Infantry April 1941 to August 1945
2nd Battalion, Suffolk Regiment June to September 1941
7th Battalion, 14th Punjab Regiment February to April 1942
1st Battalion, Assam Regiment April 1942 to March 1944
1st Battalion, Seaforth Highlanders May 1942 to August 1945
1st Battalion, 16th Punjab Regiment February to October 1943 and December 1943 to August 1945
9th Battalion, 12th Frontier Force Regiment February to April 1944
Kalibahadur Regiment, Nepal May to August 1944
2nd Battalion, 19th Hyderabad Regiment June to July 1944
158th Field Artillery Regiment, Royal Artillery February to April 1944

See also

 List of Indian Army Brigades in World War II

References

British Indian Army brigades
Military units and formations in Burma in World War II